Adrian Charles Ellison (born 11 September 1958) and is a male retired British rowing cox.

Rowing career
Ellison won the coxed pairs title with Tom Cadoux-Hudson and Richard Budgett and the coxed fours title with Cadoux-Hudson, Steve King, Geraint Fuller and Budgett, rowing for Tyrian and London University composites, at the 1982 National Rowing Championships.

Ellison coxed the men's four which brought Steve Redgrave his first Olympic gold in Los Angeles in 1984. He also competed at the 1992 Summer Olympics. He also won gold for England, again in the men's coxed fours, at the 1986 Commonwealth Games in Edinburgh, Scotland.
Ellison won World Championships bronze medals for Great Britain in 1981 (Men's coxed pair) and 1989 (Men's eight)

Personal life
He attended Reading University and studied zoology. He is a diagnostic radiographer, specialising in nuclear medicine.

References

External links
 
 
 Olympic record (olympics.org.uk)
 

1958 births
Living people
English male rowers
Coxswains (rowing)
Commonwealth Games gold medallists for England
Olympic gold medallists for Great Britain
Olympic rowers of Great Britain
Rowers at the 1986 Commonwealth Games
Olympic medalists in rowing
Alumni of the University of Reading
English Olympic medallists
Medalists at the 1984 Summer Olympics
Commonwealth Games medallists in rowing
World Rowing Championships medalists for Great Britain
Rowers at the 1984 Summer Olympics
Rowers at the 1992 Summer Olympics
Medallists at the 1986 Commonwealth Games